Vladimir Viktorovich Chekunov (born 9 February 1983) is a former Russian professional football player.

Club career
He made his debut for FC Khimki on 20 September 2006 in a Russian Cup game against FC Rostov.

External links
 
 

1983 births
Sportspeople from Volgograd
Living people
Russian footballers
Association football midfielders
FC Olimpia Volgograd players
FC Elista players
FC Chernomorets Novorossiysk players
FC Khimik-Arsenal players
FC Tekstilshchik Kamyshin players
FC Lokomotiv Nizhny Novgorod players
FC Khimki players
FC Volgar Astrakhan players
FC Energiya Volzhsky players
FC Okean Nakhodka players
Navbahor Namangan players
Uzbekistan Super League players
Russian expatriate footballers
Expatriate footballers in Uzbekistan